The Young Red Guard of Spain (abbreviated JGRE) was a youth organization in Spain during the transition to democracy and the "Late Francoism" period. It was founded as the youth wing of the Party of Labour of Spain (PTE) in 1973.

History
The JGRE was the continuation of the Universitarian Revolutionary Youth.

References

External links
 Association for the Historical Memory of the PTE and the JGRE

Youth organizations established in 1973
Youth wings of political parties in Spain
Youth wings of communist parties